Diana Paliiska (born August 20, 1966) is a Bulgarian sprint canoer who competed in the late 1980s. She won two medals at the 1988 Summer Olympics in Seoul with a silver in the K-2 500 m and a bronze in the K-4 500 m events.

Paliiska also won a bronze medal in the K-2 500 m event at the 1986 ICF Canoe Sprint World Championships in Montreal.

References

Sports-reference.com profile

1966 births
Bulgarian female canoeists
Canoeists at the 1988 Summer Olympics
Olympic canoeists of Bulgaria
Olympic silver medalists for Bulgaria
Olympic bronze medalists for Bulgaria
Living people
Olympic medalists in canoeing
ICF Canoe Sprint World Championships medalists in kayak
Medalists at the 1988 Summer Olympics